The Morton Margolin Prize for Distinguished Business Reporting is an award for reporting in business journalism published in a Colorado newspaper or magazine. It is awarded by the University of Denver Daniels College of Business and the School of Communication.

Recipients
2009: no award given
2008: Gargi Chakrabarty, Rocky Mountain News
2007: David Olinger and Aldo Svaldi, The Denver Post and Gargi Chakrabarty, Rocky Mountain News
2006: Allen Best, ColoradoBiz
2005: Paul Beebe and Bryan Oller, The Gazette
2004: Greg Griffin and Jeffrey Leib, The Denver Post
2003: Louis Aguilar and Kevin Simpson, The Denver Post
2002: Shannon Joyce Neal, The Daily Sentinel
2001: Greg Griffin, The Denver Post
2000: Tina Griego, Rocky Mountain News
1999: Al Lewis, Rocky Mountain News
1998: Michele S. Conklin, Rocky Mountain News
1997: Alan Prendergast, Westword
1996: John Accola, Rocky Mountain News
1995: Price Coleman, Rocky Mountain News
1994: Julie Hutchinson, Colorado Business
1993: Garrison Wells, Denver Business Journal
1992: Andy van De Voorde, Westword
1991: Jaye Scholl, Barron's
1990: Don Knox, Rocky Mountain News
1989: Mark Harden, The Herald (Everett, Washington)
1988: Henry Dubroff and Mark Tatge, The Denver Post
1987: Suzanne Costas, Denver Business Journal
1986: Michael Rounds, Rocky Mountain News
1985: Glenn Meyers and Jeff Rundles, Rocky Mountain Business Journal
1984: Gail Pits, The Denver Post
1983: Joe Weber, Rocky Mountain News
1982: William Boas, Jr, Colorado Business
1981: Jerry Ruhl, Rocky Mountain News
1980: Alan Gersten, Rocky Mountain News

External links
Official website

Business journalism
American journalism awards